In the girls' futsal tournament at the 2018 Summer Youth Olympics, each team had to name a preliminary squad of 20 players (minimum three must be goalkeepers). From the preliminary squad, the team had to name a final squad of 10 players (minimum two must be goalkeepers) by the FIFA deadline.

FIFA announced the squads on 30 September 2018.

Group C

Bolivia
Head coach: Ronald Pacheco

Spain
Head coach: Claudia Pons

Thailand
Head coach: Patt Sriwijit

Tonga
Head coach: Manu Tualau

Trinidad and Tobago
Head coach:  Constantine Konstin

Group D

Cameroon
Head coach: Louis Epee

Chile
Head coach:  Vicente de Luise

Dominican Republic
Head coach:  Carlos Boccicardi

Japan
Head coach: Kenichiro Kogure

Portugal
Head coach: Luís Conceição

References

squads
Futsal tournament squads